

Clothing 

 Iris Apfel (born 1921), fashion designer, co-founder of textile firm Old World Weavers
 Max Azria (1949–2019), Tunisian-born fashion designer, founder of BCBG Max Azria
 David Beckerman (1942/1943–), founder of sportswear company Starter Corp.
 Stacey Bendet (born 1975), co-founder of Alice + Olivia
 Sara Blakely (born 1971), founder of Spanx, minority owner of NBA's Atlanta Hawks
 Gertrude Boyle (1924–2019), German-born chairman of family-founded Columbia Sportswear Company
 Tory Burch (born 1966), fashion designer, founder of Tory Burch LLC
 Dov Charney (born 1966), Canadian-American founder of American Apparel
 Nudie Cohn (1902–1984), Ukrainian-born fashion designer, known for the "Nudie Suits"
 Kenneth Cole (born 1954), founder of Kenneth Cole Productions (owned Le Tigre brand)
 Jacob W. Davis (1831–1908), Latvian-born inventor of the jeans (in partnership with Levi Strauss & Co)
 Alan Eckstein, co-founder of fashion label Timo Weiland
 Paul Fireman (born 1944), founder of Fireman Capital Partners; former owner of the North American sales rights to Reebok brand and chairman of Reebok International, Ltd.
 Donald (1928–2009) and Doris F. Fisher (born 1931), founders of the Gap, Inc.
 Robert J. Fisher (born 1954), chairman of the Gap, Inc.
 Edith Flagg (1919–2014), Austrian-born fashion designer, known for populizing polyester, founder of Edith Flagg, Inc.
 Milton S. Florsheim (1868–1936), Canadian-born founder of the Florsheim & Co. shoe company
 Diane von Fürstenberg (born 1946), Belgian-American founder the Diane von Furstenberg (DVF) fashion company
 Rudi Gernreich (1922–1985), Austrian-born avant-garde fashion designer; known for creating the monokini swimsuit
 Lori Goldstein, fashion designer
 Shoshanna Lonstein Gruss (born 1975), founder of fashion label Shoshanna
 Bob Haas (born 1942), Chairman Emeritus of Levi Strauss & Co.; member of the Haas family
 Lena Himmelstein (1877–1951), Lithuanian-born founder of plus-size clothing company Lane Bryant Inc.
 Marc Jacobs (born 1963), fashion designer
 Donna Karan (born 1948), founder of DKNY
 Calvin Richard Klein (born 1942), co-founder of Calvin Klein Inc.
 Michael Kors (born 1959), fashion designer, founder of Capri Holdings (owns the Michael Kors brand, Versace, and Jimmy Choo Ltd)
 Ralph Lauren (born 1939), founder of the Ralph Lauren Corporation
 Henri Alexander Levy (born 1991), founder of luxury fashion brand Enfants Riches Déprimés (ERD)
 Andrea Lieberman, fashion designer, founder of A.L.C
 Paul Marciano (born 1952), Moroccan-born co-founder of fashion company GUESS
 Leon Max (born 1954), Russian-American fashion designer, founder of the Max Studio upmarket fashion retail chain
 Marc Milecofsky (born 1972), founder of fashion company Ecko Unltd. and the media network Complex (Complex magazine, Complex TV, ComplexCon)
 Isaac Mizrahi (born 1961), fashion designer
 Avi, Ralph and Joseph Nakash (born 1942), Israeli-born founders of Jordache Enterprises, Inc., owners of the Setai Miami Beach luxury hotel
 Andrew Rosen, co-founder of fashion label theory
 Ida Rosenthal (1886–1973), Belarus-born co-founder of Maidenform
 Rachel Zoe Rosenzweig (born 1968), fashion designer
 Barry K. Schwartz (born 1942), co-founder of Calvin Klein Inc., former chairman of the New York Racing Association (NYRA)
 Levi Strauss (1829–1902), German-born co-founder of the Levi Strauss & Co. clothing company
 David Stern (1820–1875), German-born co-founder of Levi Strauss & Co.
 Nathan Swartz (1902–1984), Russian-born founder of the Timberland Company (later led by his grandson, Jeffrey (born 1960))
 Elie Tahari (born 1952), Israeli-American luxury fashion designer
 Stuart Weitzman (born 1941), luxury shoe designer

Cosmetics 

 Bobbi Brown (born 1957), founder of Bobbi Brown Cosmetics, co-owner of the George Hotel
 Max Factor Jr. (1904–1996), president of Max Factor & Company
 Maksymilian Faktorowicz (1877–1938), Polish-born founder of Max Factor & Company (now owned by Coty, Inc.)
 Lawrence M. Gelb (1898–1980), co-founder of hair care company Clairol (Nice 'n Easy, Herbal Essences); member of the Gelb family
 Sophia Grojsman (born 1945), Belarus-born perfumer, VP of International Flavors & Fragrances (IFF)
 Estée Lauder (1906–2004), co-founder of the Estée Lauder Companies Inc.; member of the Lauder family
 Charles Revson (1906–1975), co-founder of Revlon, Inc. and the Charles H. Revson Foundation
 Katie Rodan (born 1955/1956), co-founder of Rodan + Fields (R+F), co-creator of Proactiv
 Samuel Rubin (1901–1978), Russian-born founder of Fabergé, Inc.
 Helena Rubinstein (1872–1965), Polish-born founder of Helena Rubinstein Incorporated
 Lydia Sarfati, Polish-born co-founder of seaweed-based cosmetics company Sarkli-Repêchage
 Burt Shavitz (1935–2015), co-founder of personal care products company Burt's Bees
 Emily Weiss (born 1984), founder of cosmetics company Glossier
 Suzi Weiss-Fischmann (born 1956), Hungarian-born co-founder of nail polish manufacturer OPI

Food 

 S. Daniel Abraham (born 1924), founder of the Thompson Medical Company (known for SlimFast)
 Isaac Wolfe Bernheim (1848–1945), German-born co-founder of the Bernheim Brothers Distilling Company (known for the I. W. Harper bourbon whiskey brand)
 Sam Born (1891–1959), Russian-born candy maker, founder of Just Born
 Ben Cohen (born 1951), co-founder of ice cream company Ben & Jerry's
 Richard B. Cohen (born 1952), owner of C&S Wholesale Grocers, the largest wholesale grocery supply company in the U.S.
 Nathan Cummings (1896–1985), Canadian-born founder of the Sara Lee Corporation
 Hilda Eisen (1917–2017), Polish-born co-founder of egg distribution company Norco Ranch Inc.
 Benjamin Eisenstadt (1906–1996), founder of the Cumberland Packing Corporation, inventor of Sweet'n Low (artificial sweetener)
 Charles Louis Fleischmann (1835–1897), Austrian Silesian-born co-founder of Fleischmann Co. (Fleischmann's Yeast, Fleischmann's vodka)
 Sidney Frank (1919–2006), U.S. promoter of Grey Goose vodka and Jägermeister
 Michel Fribourg (1913–2001), Belgian-American chairman and CEO of family-owned ContiGroup Companies (later led by his son, Paul (1954/1955–))
 Isaac Friedlander (1823–1878), German-born grain merchant
 Leon Godchaux (1824–1899), French-born sugar farmer and refiner; founder of Leon Godchaux Clothing Co.
 Seth Goldman (born 1965), co-founder of Honest Tea
 Arnold Greenberg (1932–2012), co-founder of tea and juice drinks brand Snapple
 Max Samuel Grifenhagen (1861–1932), founder of Duffy-Mott Company, Inc. and the Monopole Vineyards Corporation
 Ken Grossman (born 1954), founder of the Sierra Nevada Brewing Company
 Paul Kalmanovitz (1905–1987), Polish-born brewing company magnate, LBO specialist
 Eugene Kashper (born 1969), Russian-born chairman of the Pabst Brewing Company
 Harold Katz (born 1936/1937), founder of weight loss products provider Nutrisystem, Inc. and former owner of NBA's Philadelphia 76ers
 Samuel Liebmann (1799–1872), German-born founder of the S. Liebmann Brewery (Rheingold Beer); later led by his sons, Charles (1837–1928), Joseph (1831–1913), and Henry (1836–1915)
 Daniel Lubetzky (born 1968), Mexican-American founder of snack company Kind LLC
 Dov Behr Manischewitz (1857–1914), Lithuanian-born founder of kosher products company Manischewitz
 Paul Merage (born 1934), Iranian-born co-founder of Chef America Inc. and inventor of the Hot Pockets microwaveable meals; member of the Merage family
 Nelson Morris (1838–1907), German-born founder of meatpacking company Morris & Company (later led by his son, Edward)
 Joseph Neubauer (born 1941), Mandatory Palestine-born former CEO of the Aramark Corp., and former VP of PepsiCo, Inc.
 Harry Ornest (1923–1998), vending machine magnate, owner of NHL's St. Louis Blues and CFL's Toronto Argonauts
 Lynda (born 1943) and Stewart Resnick (born 1936), founders of the Wonderful Company (holds Fiji Water, POM Wonderful, Teleflora)
 Irene Rosenfeld (born 1953), chairman and CEO of Mondelez, former CEO of Kraft Foods
 Lewis Rosenstiel (1891–1976), founder of Schenley Industries
 Sholom Rubashkin (born 1951), former CEO of kosher meat-packing company Agriprocessors, Inc.; member of the Rubashkin family
 Rodney Sacks (born 1949/1950), South African-born chairman and CEO of the Monster Beverage Corporation (Monster Energy, Relentless, Burn, Mother)
 Marvin Sands (1924–1999), founder of Constellation Brands (now led by his sons, Rob (1958/1959-) and Richard (born 1950/1951))
 Russell Weiner (born 1970), founder of Rockstar, Inc. (Rockstar energy drink)
 Sam Zemurray (1877–1961), Russian-born founder of the Cuyamel Fruit Company (an ancestor of Chiquita Brands International)

Manufacturing and distribution 

 Don Aronow (1927–1987), speedboat manufacturer (Magnum Marine, Formula Boats)
 Charles Avnet (1888–1979), Russian-born founder of electronics parts distributor Avnet, Inc.
 Benjamin Abrams (1893–1967), founder of Emerson Radio & Phonograph Corporation
 Saul Brandman (1925–2008), clothing manufacturer, developed the brands Timely Trends and Tomboy
 Peter Brant (born 1947), co-owner of paper manufacturer Brant-Allen Industries
 Eli Broad (1933–2021), co-founder of KB Home (Kaufman & Broad)
 J. M. Brunswick (1819–1886), Swiss-born founder of J.M. Brunswick Manufacturing Co. (now Brunswick Corporation)
 Bill Davidson (1922–2009), chairman and CEO of Guardian Industries and owner of NBA's Detroit Pistons
 Charles Dayan (born 1941), founder of Bonjour Capital and co-founder of Bonjour Jeans
 Isadore Familian (1911–2002), owner and CEO of Price Pfister
 Joseph Fels (1853–1914), soap manufacturer, co-developer of the Fels-Naptha brand
 Oscar Hammerstein I (1846–1919), German-born cigar manufacturer, founder of the U.S Tobacco Journal
 Bradley S. Jacobs (born 1956), chairman and CEO of XPO Logistics, Inc., co-founder of United Rentals, Inc.
 Sidney Jacobson (1918–2005), founder of industrial equipment distributor MSC Industrial Direct (formerly Sid Tool, Inc.)
 Julius Kayser (1838–1920), founder of the Julius Kayser Company (now Kayser-Roth)
 Joseph Koret (1900–1982), Russian-born founder of textile company Koret of California
 Jeffrey Lorberbaum (born 1954), chairman and CEO of Mohawk Industries
 Morton Mandel (1921–2019), co-founder of electronics parts distributor Premier Industrial Corporation
 Morris Markin (1893–1970), Russian-born founder of the Checker Motors Corporation
 Martha Nierenberg (1924–2020), Hungarian-born co-founder of home accessories distributor and retailer Dansk International Designs
 Lawrence S. Phillips (1927–2015), chairman of the Phillips-Van Heusen Corporation (now PVH Corp.; owns the Tommy Hilfiger Corporation, Calvin Klein Inc., IZOD)
 Mitchell (born 1956) and Steven M. Rales (born 1951), founders of the Danaher Corporation
 Isaac Rice (1850–1915), German-born founder of the Electric Boat Company (now General Dynamics Electric Boat)
 Adolf Rosenberger (1900–1967), German-born co-founder of the Porsche GmbH
 Chester H. Roth (1902–1977), founder of the Chester H. Roth Company (now Kayser-Roth)
 Milton Shapp (1912–1994), founder of cable television equipment manufacturing company Jerrold Electronics
 Irving S. Shapiro (1916–2001), former CEO of DuPont
 Alfred P. Slaner (1918–1996), president of clothing manufacturer Kayser-Roth
 Paul Soros (1926–2013), Hungarian-born shipping industry magnate, founder of Soros Associates; member of the Soros family
 Ronald Stanton (1928–2016), German-born founder of fertilizer, chemical, and fuels distributor Transammonia Inc. (now Trammo, Inc.)
 William Ungar (1913–2013), Polish-born founder of the National Envelope Corporation
 Linda J. Wachner (born 1946), former president and CEO of textile/clothing distribution company Warnaco Group, Inc.
 Ira D. Wallach (1909–2007), CEO of family-owned Central National-Gottesman, Inc. (formerly M. Gottesman & Company), one of the world's largest distributors of pulp, paper, packaging, tissue, newsprint and plywood
 Ernest M. Wuliger (1920–1992), owner of the Ohio-Sealy Mattress Manufacturing Company
 Felix Zandman (1928–2011), Polish-born founder of electronic components manufacturer Vishay Intertechnology

Miscellaneous 

 Jacob Arabo (born 1964), Uzbek-born founder of Diamond District-based jewelry company Jacob & Co
 Norman Braman (born 1932), car dealer, former co-owner of NFL's Philadelphia Eagles; Madoff Ponzi scheme victim
 Edgar M. Cullman (1918–2011), former co-owner, president and CEO of the General Cigar Company
 Lazarus Dinkelspiel (1824–1900), German-born founder of L. Dinkelspiel & Co.
 Gary Friedman (born 1957), chairman and CEO of Restoration Hardware (RH)
 Leo Gerstenzang (1892–1961), Polish-born founder of Leo Gerstenzang Infant Novelty Co., inventor of Q-tips
 Samuel Glazer (1923–2012), co-founder of Mr. Coffee, one of the first automatic drip coffee makers
 Aron Goldfarb (1924–2012), Polish-born founder of licensed and owned apparel brands manufacturing company G-III Apparel Group
 John D. Hertz (1879–1961), Slovak-born founder of the Yellow Cab Company
 Michael Krasny (1952/1953–), founder of the CDW Corporation
 Moshe Lax, co-founder of the Dynamic Diamond Corp., former chairman of the Ivanka Trump Fine Jewelry Company
 Sydney Lewis (1919–1999), founder of the Best Products Company
 Helly Nahmad (born 1978), art dealer, founder of Manhattan-based Helly Nahmad Gallery; member of the Nahmad family
 Victor Potamkin (1911–1995), former car dealership owner, founder of the Potamkin Automotive Group
 Harold Roitenberg (1927–2018), founder of catalog merchandiser and showroom Modern Merchandising Inc.; Madoff Ponzi scheme victim
 Jamie Salter, Canadian-American founder of brand management company Authentic Brands Group (owns Volcom, Spyder, Juicy Couture, Frederick's, Tapout, Nautica)
 Jay Schottenstein (born 1954), founder of the Schottenstein Stores Corp., owner of American Signature, chairman of American Eagle
 Lorraine Schwartz, jewelry designer
 Benny Shabtai, Israeli-American former owner of the North American sales rights to luxury watch brand Raymond Weil
 Maurice Tempelsman (born 1929), Belgian-American diamond magnate, founder of the Tempelsman Group, chairman of Lazare Kaplan International (LKI)
 Les Wexner (born 1937), chairman and CEO of L Brands, Inc. (owns Victoria's Secret, Bath & Body Works)
 David Yurman (born 1942), co-founder of jewelry company David Yurman Enterprises LLC
 Morris B. Zale (1901–1995), Russian-born co-founder of jewelry retailer, the Zale Corporation

Stores 

 Abraham Abraham (1843–1911), co-founder of department store Abraham & Straus (A&S); member of the Abraham family
 Benjamin Altman (1840–1913), founder of B. Altman and Company
 Beatrice Fox Auerbach (1887–1968), former president and director of G. Fox & Co.
 Richard A. Baker (born 1965), Executive Chairman of the Hudson's Bay Company (HBC)
 Louis Bamberger (1855–1944), co-founder of L. Bamberger & Company
 Henri Willis Bendel (1868–1936), founder of women's accessories store Henri Bendel, Inc.
 Arthur Blank (born 1942), co-founder of the Home Depot, owner of NFL's Atlanta Falcons
 Joseph and Lyman Bloomingdale, co-founders of Bloomingdale's
 Rose Blumkin, Belarus-born founder of the Nebraska Furniture Mart
 Albert Boscov, former president and CEO of Boscov's department store
 Jeffrey Brotman, co-founder of the Costco Wholesale Corporation
 Jacob Elias Cohen, Irish-born former president and CEO of Jacksonville, Florida-based Cohen Brothers department store
 Mickey Drexler, former chairman and CEO of J.Crew Group, Inc.
 Edward and Abraham Lincoln Filene, former executives at family-founded Filene's department store
 Felix Fuld, German-born co-founder of L. Bamberger & Company
 Adam Gimbel, founder of the Gimbels department store
 Sonny Gindi, co-founder of the Century 21 department store
 Dave Gold, founder of 99 Cents Only Stores
 Maurice Goldblatt, co-founder of the Goldblatt's department store
 Sylvan Nathan Goldman, former Oklahoma-based supermarket chain owner; inventor of the shopping cart
 Shira Goodman, president and CEO of Staples, Inc.
 Salmon Portland Chase Halle (1866–1949), co-founder of the Halle Brothers department store
 Asher Hamburger (1821–1897), German-born founder of the A. Hamburger & Sons department store (later May Company California)
 Fred Hayman, Swiss-born founder of luxury boutique Giorgio Beverly Hills
 Leo Kahn, co-founder of office supply retailing corporation Staples Inc.
 Edgar J. Kaufmann (1885–1955), president of Kaufmann's Department Store in Pittsburgh
 Sidney Kimmel, founder of Jones Apparel Group and Sidney Kimmel Entertainment, minority owner of NBA's Miami Heat
 Solomon Lazard (1827–1916), co-founder of the City of Paris department store
 Simon Lazarus, German-born founder of the Lazarus department store (later The F&R Lazarus & Co., merged with Macy's Inc.)
 Leon Levine, founder of the Family Dollar chain of discount stores
 Bernard Marcus, co-founder of the Home Depot
 Herbert Marcus (1878–1950), co-founder of luxury retailer Neiman Marcus (later led by his sons, Stanley and Lawrence)
 Alfred Marshall, co-founder of off-price department store Marshalls, Inc.
 David May, German-born founder of the May Department Stores Company (now Macy's, Inc.); member of the May family
 Ed Mirvish, American-Canadian founder of discount store Honest Ed's
 Al (1875–1970) and Carrie Marcus Neiman (1883–1953), co-founders of Neiman Marcus
 Sol Polk, co-founder of appliance retailer Polk Bros., Inc.
 Barney Pressman, founder of Barneys New York
 Sol Price, founder of Price Club (merged with Costco)
 Julius Rosenwald, former president and part-owner of Sears; featured in the 2015 documentary film Rosenwald
 Andrew Saks (1847–1912), founder of luxury department store chain Saks Fifth Avenue
 Rabinovitz/Rabb family, founders of the Stop & Shop supermarket chain
 Abram M. Rothschild, founder of A.M. Rothschild Company
 Frank Russek (1875/1876–1948), co-founder of the Russeks department store chain
 Henry Siegel, German-born co-founder of the Siegel-Cooper Company
 Isidor Straus, German-born former co-owner of Macy's department store; Titanic victim
 Marcus Younker, Polish-born co-founder of the Younker Brothers department store
 George Zimmer, founder of Men's Wearhouse

Toys and games 

 Beatrice Alexander (1895–1990), founder of the Alexander Doll Company
 Mel Birnkrant (born 1937), toy designer (Outer Space Men, Baby Face)
 Paul Budnitz (born 1967), founder of art toys companies Kidrobot and Superplastic, co-founder of social network Ello
 Joshua Lionel Cowen (1877–1965), co-founder of toy trains manufacturing company Lionel Corp. (later owned by his great-nephew, Roy Cohn); inventor of the flash-lamp
 Jack Friedman (1939–2010), toy and video game industry veteran, founder of LJN and Jakks Pacific, co-founder of THQ
 Eddy Goldfarb (born 1921), toy inventor (Yakity Yak Talking Teeth, Stompers)
 Elliot (1916–2011) and Ruth Handler (1916–2002), co-founders of Mattel Inc. (Barbie, Hot Wheels, Masters of the Universe)
 Henry Hassenfeld, Polish-born co-founder of toys and games company Hasbro, Inc. (originally Hassenfeld Brothers)
 Isaac Heller (1926–2015), co-founder of Remco Industries, Inc.
 Isaac Larian (born 1954), Iranian-born founder of MGA Entertainment, Inc., the biggest privately owned toy company in the world
 Charles Lazarus (1923–2018), founder of Toys "R" Us
 Louis Marx (1896–1982), former toymaker, co-founder of Louis Marx and Company
 Morris Michtom (1870–1938), Russian-born founder of the Ideal Toy Company, inventor of the Teddy bear
 Henry Orenstein (born 1923), Polish-born toymaker, founder of Topper Toys (Johnny Lightning, Dawn doll, Suzy Homemaker)
 Isaac Perlmutter (born 1942), Israeli-American chairman of Marvel Entertainment, former co-owner of Toy Biz (later Marvel Toys)

See also 
 Lists of Jewish Americans
 Businesspeople
 in finance
 in media
 in real estate

References 

American businesspeople in retailing
businesspeople
Jewish